John David Digues La Touche (5 June 1861 Tours – 6 May 1935, Majorca (at sea)) was an Irish ornithologist, naturalist, and zoologist. La Touche's career was as a customs official in China.

The La Touche family was of Huguenot extraction, however John David Digues La Touche was educated at Downside Abbey, near Bath. He entered the Imperial Maritime Customs Service in China in 1882 where he lived until 1921.
He retired to Dublin and later lived in County Wicklow Newtownmountkennedy.

During his time in China, he made extensive ornithological observations and collections, resulting in many important publications. Notably, he wrote the A Handbook of the Birds of Eastern China, consisting of two volumes and altogether ten parts that were published in 1925–1934 (Taylor & Francis, London). He also made other collections, including reptiles and amphibians.

La Touche's free-tailed bat and La Touche's mole are named after him. A species of Chinese snake, Opisthotropis latouchii, is named in his honour. Also, a genus of flowering plants from China (belonging to the family Gentianaceae) was named in  honour of La Touche and his wife, with the Latin specific epithet of fokienensis (of the species) referring to La Touche's wife, née Caroline Dawson Focken (c. 1871 – c. 1945).

Works
Further Notes on the Birds of the Province of Fohkien in South-east China (1917)

References

La Touche, John Davis Digues
Irish people of French descent
1861 births
1935 deaths
19th-century Irish people